Isabelle is a novella (described as a récit) by André Gide, published in 1911.

Plot
25-year-old Gérard Lacase from the Sorbonne studies for his doctorate on Jacques-Bénigne Bossuet at the remote castle of Quartfourche in northern Normandy. He falls in love with a portrait of Isabelle, the daughter of the family who owns the castle.

References

1911 French novels
Novels by André Gide
French novellas
Novels set in the 1890s